Nicholas P. Tosches (October 23, 1949 – October 20, 2019) was an American journalist, novelist, biographer, and poet. His 1982 biography of Jerry Lee Lewis, Hellfire, was praised by Rolling Stone magazine as "the best rock and roll biography ever written."

Biography
Tosches was born in Newark, New Jersey, on October 23, 1949. His surname originated from Albanian settlers in Italy, known as Arbëreshë; his grandfather emigrated from the village of Casalvecchio di Puglia to New York City in the late 19th century.

According to his own account, Tosches "barely finished high school". He did not attend college but was published for the first time in Fusion magazine at 19 years old. He also held a variety of jobs, including working as a porter for his family's business in New Jersey, as a paste-up artist for the Lovable underwear company in New York City, and later, in the early 1970s, as a snake hunter for the Miami Serpentarium, in Florida. A fan of early rock and roll and "oddball" records, he wrote for several rock music magazines, including Creem and Rolling Stone. He was also reviews editor for Country Music magazine. He has been described as "the best example of a good rock journalist who set out to transcend his genre and succeeded," and as someone who "along with Lester Bangs, Richard Meltzer and a handful of other noble notables from the era... elevated rock writing to a new plateau." He was fired by Rolling Stone for collaborating with Meltzer in filing record reviews under each other's byline.

Tosches' first book, Country: The Biggest Music in America (later retitled Country: The Twisted Roots of Rock and Roll), was first published in 1977. It was followed in 1982 by Hellfire, a biography of Jerry Lee Lewis, and in 1984 by Unsung Heroes of Rock 'n' Roll: The Birth of Rock in the Wild Years Before Elvis. He subsequently wrote biographies of the singer and entertainer Dean Martin, the Sicilian financier Michele Sindona, the heavyweight boxer Sonny Liston, the country singer Emmett Miller, the soul/rock band Hall & Oates and the racketeer Arnold Rothstein.

Tosches worked as a contributing editor of Vanity Fair magazine. His work was also published in Esquire and Open City. He published five novels, Cut Numbers (1988), Trinities (1994), In the Hand of Dante (2002), Me and the Devil (2012), and Under Tiberius (2015); and a collection of poetry, Chaldea and I Dig Girls (1999). He also worked on Never Trust a Loving God, a book he did in collaboration with his friend the French painter Thierry Alonso Gravleur. He described his literary influences as "Hesiod, Sappho, Christopher Marlowe, Ezra Pound, William Faulkner, Charles Olson, and God knows who else." A compendium, The Nick Tosches Reader, collects writings from over the course of his career.

Tosches was featured on the Travel Channel show Anthony Bourdain: No Reservations in the episode "Disappearing Manhattan", in which he and Bourdain shared a drink at Sophie's in the East Village, a Manhattan dive bar, and discussed the changing nature of the city.

Tosches died on October 20, 2019, at his home in Manhattan, three days before his 70th birthday.

Bibliography

Biographies
 1982 – 
 1984 – 
 1986 – 
 1992 – 
 2000 – 
 2001 – 
 2005 –

Fiction and poetry
 1988 – 
 1994 – 
 1999 – 
 2002 – 
 2012 – 
 2014 – 
 2015 –

Journalism
 1977 – 
 1984 – 
 1991 – 
 1999 – 
 2002 – 
 2009 – 
 2011 –

Collections
 2000 –

Discography
 Blue Eyes and Exit Wounds, with Hubert Selby Jr., produced by the author Harold Goldberg, 1998
 Nick & Homer, with Homer Henderson, 1998
 Fuckthelivingfuckthedead, 2001
 For the taking: Vol. I from CHALDEA 
 Autohagiography, with Austin Brookner, 2018

Film and television appearances
 Louis Prima: The Wildest!, 1999
 Hubert Selby Jr: It/ll Be Better Tomorrow, 2005
 Buy the Ticket, Take the Ride: Hunter S. Thompson on Film, 2006
 Anthony Bourdain: No Reservations in the episode "Disappearing Manhattan", 2009

References

External links
 Brief bio
 
 Rolling Stone
 Vanity Fair
Episode 579 – Nick Tosches of WTF with Marc Maron

1949 births
2019 deaths
20th-century American biographers
20th-century American male writers
20th-century American novelists
20th-century American poets
21st-century American biographers
21st-century American male writers
21st-century American novelists
21st-century American poets
American male novelists
American male poets
American music critics
American people of Arbëreshë descent
Boxing writers
Novelists from New Jersey
Writers from Newark, New Jersey
American male biographers